The labour transfer programme or scheme in the Tibet Autonomous Region of the People's Republic of China, is part of the vocational training programmes run by the Chinese government under the Chinese Communist Party (CCP) aimed at teaching skills, providing jobs, improving standards of living and lifting Tibetans out of poverty. The Tibetan regional government came out with a policy paper in March 2019 called the "2019–2020 Farmer and Pastoralist Training and Labor Transfer Action Plan" which mandates the "military-style…[vocational] training".

Many aspects of the scheme have been called coercive, with religious re-education and correction of "backward thinking" including "thought education" also being planned for Tibetans excessively influenced by religion. The training includes learning the Chinese language and developing "gratitude" for the CCP. Plans for "poverty alleviation" say that the state must "stop raising up lazy people".

Background 
According to a September 2020 report by German anthropologist Adrian Zenz sponsored by the Jamestown Foundation, over 500,000 Tibetans, mostly subsistence farmers and herders, were trained in the first seven months of 2020 in military-style training centres experts say are akin to labour camps. The study adds the training programs lead to most workers ending up in low-paid jobs like textile manufacturing, construction, and agriculture. However, the Jamestown Foundation study stresses that in Tibet, the labour scheme is "potentially less coercive" than what is alleged in Xinjiang internment camps. The study concluded:

Chinese government reactions 
Officials in Chinese administered Tibet have defended the "vocational training program", saying that it allows the locals to acquire new work skills and improve living standards. Tibetans are not forced to take part in the program, and if they do, they have the choice of taking up the training they want, such as driving or welding.

See also 

 List of re-education through labor camps in China
 Re-education through labor

Further reading 
 Adrian Zenz (24 September 2020). China Has a New Plan to Tame Tibet. The New York Times.
 The 2019-2020 Farmer and Pastoralist Training and Labor Transfer Action Plan (in Chinese). Via — archive.org.

References 

Human rights of ethnic minorities in China
Political repression in China
Human rights abuses in China
Tibet Autonomous Region